The  is a megalithic tomb (kofun) located in Sakurai, Nara Prefecture, Japan. The Hashihaka kofun is considered to be the first large keyhole-shaped kofun constructed in Japan and is associated with the emergence of the Yamato Kingship.

There is also a scholarly theory that the Hashihaka kofun is the tomb of Himiko, the queen of Yamatai. Researchers in 2013 conducted the first-ever on-site survey of the Hashihaka kofun after being granted access by the Imperial Household Agency. The actual burial site is unknown, but the Imperial Household Agency has designated it as the tomb of Oichi no Haka, the seventh Kōrei princess, Yamatotsuki Hyakuso no Mikoto. Also, since the research of Shinya Kasai, there is a theory that it may be the tomb of Himiko, the queen of Yamataikoku. The moat around the site has been designated as a historic site by the government, Part of the pond has been selected as one of the 100 best reservoirs as "Chopenaka Great Pond.

The name Hashihaka translates as "chopstick grave" and refers to a mythical love affair between Yamato Totohi Momoso and the kami of sacred Mount Miwa, which ended with the princess stabbing herself to death with a chopstick.

Overview 
It is the main tumulus of the Alluvial fan zone at the northwestern foot of Miwa in the southeastern Nara Basin, and is located in the Chopashinaka district of the Garimuku site. It is located in the city. It is considered to be one of the oldest burial mounds of the emergence period.

The date of construction was determined by archaeological dating of earthenware (Doji pottery) excavated from the surrounding dugouts and by radiocarbon dating According to Yamataikoku, there is a theory that places the date in the middle to late third century, close to the year of death of Himiko (not far from 248) in the Emataikoku. On the other hand, some date it to the mid-fourth century or later, because recent carbon-14 dating methods have shown that the date is estimated to be 50–100 years older than the actual date, and because the size and style of the tomb is different from that described in the Wei Jiwa-jin Den.
Currently, the Imperial Household Agency manages the tomb as a mausoleum, and researchers and the public are not allowed to enter the tumulus freely. Wajaku-no-Tsukihime-no-Mikoto is the sister of Emperor Kōgen, the grandfather of Emperor Sujin in The Chronicles of Japan. Oichi is the name of the place where the tomb is located. In the Kojiki, she is named Yamato Tomomosobime.

In the world of archaeology, the theory that "Queen Himiko = Wajaku-no-Hyakusohime-no-mikoto" was proposed by Shinya Kasai, who had advocated the theory of the Yamatai Internal Theory since the Taisho period", and later developed into the theory that "the tomb of Chopstick Tomb = Himiko's tomb", which was pioneering research leading to the discussions of today.

Etymology 
The origin of the name is based on a legend that a chopstick pierced the pubic region of Princess Hyakuso, causing her to die. In the Nihon Shoki, Soshin, September 10, there is a story as follows. It is generally referred to as the Legend of Mount Miwa.
The "Nihon Shoki" also describes the construction as follows.

There is also a theory by Hiroshi Tsuchihashi that the tombs of the Doji clan, a group that created ancient burial mounds, became  Hashihaka Kofuns from the tombs of the Doji clan, or Doji tombs, because of the large gap between the introduction of chopsticks to Japan (7th century) and myths about them.

Tomb shape and size 

In 1968, Yoshiro Kondo pointed out that the front part of an old stage front-recessed circular mound opens wide from the middle, and the Hashihaka Kofun, which has this mound shape, is now considered to be an old burial mound. The contour lines on the survey map indicate that the frontal part was wider than it is now. Other burial mounds with a repellent-shaped frontal opening include the Yakuyama No. 1 burial mound in Tatsuno City, Hyogo Prefecture, the Gongenyama No. 51 burial mound in the same prefecture, the Tsubaki-Otsukayama burial mound in Kizugawa, Kyoto Prefecture, and the Urama Chausuyama burial mound in Okayama, Okayama Prefecture. The Urama Chausuyama burial mound is said to be one-half the size of the Hashihaka Kofun burial mound, both in length and width, but with a difference in the shape of the apex of the frontal portion: a horizontal rectangle and a trapezoidal shape.

Based on the results of a survey of the surrounding area, it is possible that it was originally larger.

The front part is said to have four steps in front, although the side steps are not clear. Incidentally, five-tiered construction (four-tiered construction with a small circular hill on the rear part) is only found in the  Hashihaka Kofun mound, while four-tiered construction (three-tiered construction with a small circular hill on the rear part) is found in the Nishidonotsuka tomb (Yamato tumulus group), Andonyama tumulus (Yanagimoto tumulus group), Shibuyamukiyama tomb (Yanagimoto tumulus group), Sakurai Chausuyama tomb (Torimiyama tumulus group), Mesuriyama tumulus (Torimiyama tumulus group), and Tsukiyama All other tombs in the emperor's mausoleum class are considered to have been built in a three-tiered construction (both the rear circle and the front part are built in a three-tiered construction). This may indicate the rating of the person buried in the tomb.

In the moat area on the southeast side of the rear circle, a causeway with thatched stones piled up on both sides was found.

It is estimated that the site is located in the same area. This is presumed to be a depression topography caused by earth removal from the mound from which the soil used to build the mound was collected.

Surface facilities and artifacts 
A thatching stone made of Kawahara stone has been identified on the northern slope of the mound at the tip of the anterior part. In addition, while special vessels and jars, which were probably brought from the Okayama City area, were found only on the posterior part of the mound, jar-shaped Doji pottery with a double rim and a hole in the bottom were collected on the anterior part, suggesting that the placement position of the vessels may have been differentiated according to the type of vessel. Based on the excavation of a special vessel stand and a special jar, it is believed that the mound was constructed in the early Kofun period.

The burial facility is unknown, but a basalt slab was found at the foot of the mound, suggesting that a pit-type stone chamber may have been constructed, and if this burial mound is Himiko's tomb, it contradicts the statement in Wei Jiwa Jinden that "there is a sarcophagus, but no burial chamber". The stone is known to be from Shibayama in Kashiwara, Osaka Prefecture. Therefore, it is not the stone from Mount Osaka (Mount Nijō) mentioned in the Soshiniki.

Construction period 
Based on the shape of the mound and the contents of excavated artifacts, Taichiro Shiraishi and others have pointed out that it is the oldest class of posterior-frontal round mounds. Prior to the renovation of the levee on the west side of Chashinaka Pond, which is outside the designated area of the tomb, the Archaeological Institute of Kashihara, Nara Prefecture, conducted a preliminary survey and unearthed a large amount of Furu-zero-shiki earthenware from the bottom of the moat around the site. The Institute of Archaeological Research, Archaeological Institute of Kashihara, Nara Prefecture, estimated the actual age of these vessels to be 280–300 years (±10–20 years) based on Carbon-14 dating.

However, the earthenware was not found in the tomb itself, and even if the carbonized material on the earthenware found at the bottom of the moat outside the designated mausoleum area is dated to the late third century, it does not represent the date of construction of the tomb, since there are remains from the Jomon to Kofun periods at the site where this tomb was excavated, and even if it were the late third century, it would be later than Himiko's death date.

Horse harness excavated from a ditch 
Although the "Wajinden" describes the absence of oxen and horses, harnesses (wooden stirrups) have been excavated from the Zhou shelter.

During the 109th excavation of the Garui Site conducted by the Sakurai City Board of Education in 2000, a wooden wheel stirrup (harness) was found in the upper layer of the overlying soil (plant layer) inside the moat. The Nunome I earthenware excavated at the same time dates it to the early fourth century, which may have contributed to the influx of equestrian culture into the Japanese archipelago and to the East Asia, the understanding of the spread of equestrian culture in the region is now older and more revised than before. The excavation is not directly related to the chronology of the construction of the tomb itself, since it was excavated from the soil layer deposited after the moat had ceased to function and had begun to be buried.

The oldest stirrups that can be identified are only on one side of the Terracotta Warriors excavated from burial mounds in Sianbei and Eastern Jin in 302 and 322. Thus, the stirrup was invented around 290–300. The Chinese character for stirrup, "金編に登", derives from the fact that early stirrups were made of metal and used only as a foothold for horseback riding. Wooden stirrups appeared after iron stirrups. The oldest known wooden stirrup is said to be a wooden-core, iron-plated stirrup from Cheonan Doi-dong in the early Baekje period (early fourth century) on the Korean Peninsula. Onoyama Setsu, in his book "Early Horse Equipments Discovered in Japan," classifies wooden-core, iron-plated stirrups into two types: old-style and new-style. According to this classification, the stirrup excavated from the moat around the tomb of  Hashihaka Kofun cannot be confirmed because the lower part is missing, but judging from the remaining parts, the stirrup is considered to be of the new style.
 The handle is elongated.
 The head of the handle is angular.

The head of the handle is angular.

The first half of the fourth century was shortly after the invention of the stirrup in China, and small iron stirrups can be found in Terracotta Armys from this period, but they functioned only as footrests for horseback riding. The oldest wooden stirrups excavated on the Korean peninsula, dating from the Baekje period (first half of the fourth century), show dramatic improvements, such as the addition of iron plates to the wooden form, making them suitable for horseback riding. Wooden stirrups are not found in mural tombs around Goguryeo, where they are thought to have been developed, until the fifth century or later. It is doubtful that the stirrups were introduced to the Korean peninsula in the first half of the fourth century, and since Baekje did not become a centralized state until the mid-4th century, it is more likely that the wooden stirrups were introduced in the mid-4th century or later. Furthermore, considering the time when these stirrups were introduced to Japan, it is preferable to date the wooden stirrups from the Chopedombs burial mound to the late fourth or fifth century at the earliest, and the fact that they are later in date also supports this.

Opinions on age 
The date of construction varies slightly depending on the chronology of the researcher. Kazuo Hirose places the date in the mid to late third century. Taichiro Shiraishi places the date in the mid to late third century, and says, "The mid-third century is the time of Himiko's successor, Taiyo, although she is dead. He also argues that "the mid-third century is after the mid-third century. Kaoru Terasawa places the date around 260–280 AD, and Hironobu Ishino places it in the fourth quarter of the late third century, from 280 to 290 AD.

Although introduced as the oldest front-rear circular mound in Japan, there are many other front-rear circular mounds, including the Hokenoyama tumulus, the Garasu Katsuyama tumulus, the Garasu Yatsuka tumulus, the Kammon tumulus group (Kammon No. 5 and Kammon No. 4), and the Tsujihata tumulus. Unlike the shape of these mounds, which are known as the "garashiko-type front-recessed circular mounds," the  Hashihaka Kofun Tumulus is a typical front-recessed circular mound with an enlarged square mound, and is generally considered to have been constructed from the late third century to the early fourth century.

Significance 
It is clearly different from the previous burial mounds, such as the fact that the excavated relics have Kibi-type pottery, which is the ancestral form of Haniwa. In addition, it is thought that the scale and haniwa became a model of the tumulus after that, and many researchers evaluate the construction of this tumulus as the beginning of the kofun period.

Other 

During the Oda clan's rule, a tea house was established on the mound. The ditch on the southeast side of the posterior circle is probably due to the presence of a teahouse run by Chopinaka Chosha during the Edo period near the foot of the mound. It is said that candies and sweetmeats were sold mainly to travelers on their way to Ise as a specialty. The outer bank hanging over the moat was also found a little to the east of the moat.

The ditch diagonally attached to the boundary between the anterior and the posterior circle on the survey map is the remains of a path used by the villagers before it was closed to entry.

On February 20, 2013, the first survey was realized at the request of the Japanese Archaeological Association and others.

In April 2018 (Heisei 30), the Archaeological Institute of Kashihara, Nara Prefecture, examined 26 jar-shaped earthenware and jar-shaped haniwa clay figures excavated from the anterior section and 54 fragments of funerary ritual pottery excavated from the top of the posterior circle, and found that while the pottery in the anterior section is local soil, the soil in the posterior circle is very similar in character to that of the Kibi region. This suggests that the finished products manufactured in the Kibi area were arranged in the posterior part and that the power of the Kibi area was very powerful and played an important role in the construction of the  Hashihaka Kofun Tumulus.

Documentaries 
 ETV special "Birth: Yamato Kingship – Now the Anterior Posterior Circular Tumulus Speaks Out" (March 27, 2021, NHK E-TV)

Cultural property

National Historic Site 
 Hashihaka Kofun Peripheral Moat – Designated February 9, 2017

Annotations

Footnotes

References

Bibliography

See also 
 Himiko
 Kofun period
 Kofun system
 Makimuku ruins
 Yamatai
 Yamatai Honshu Theory
 Yamato Kingship
 Yayoi period

External links 
 箸墓古墳 – 桜井市
 箸墓古墳 – 桜井市観光協会
 

Ponds of Japan
Coordinates on Wikidata
Yamatai
Kofun period
Kofun
Pages with unreviewed translations